This is a list of equipment used by the Peruvian Army.

Infantry weapons

Pistols

Shotguns

Assault rifles and carbines

Battle and sniper rifles

Submachine guns

Machine guns

Portable anti-materiel weapons

Vehicles

Armoured vehicles

Light utility vehicles

Transport

Maintenance vehicles

Specialized vehicles

Artillery

Rocket launchers

Self-propelled artillery

Towed artillery

Mortars

Anti-tank weapons

Air-defense systems

Army aviation 
The Peruvian army aviation (Aviación del Ejército Peruano) was formed in 1971 to support army ground units. A large number of MI-8 Hip Cs were purchased in the mid-1970s to provide an airborne assault assets. This led to the purchase of the MI-17 which now makes up much of the army transport fleet. A number of Aerospatiale SA 315Bs are used for training purposes, also used in the training role are nine Enstrom F28F Falcons that were received in 1992. The mainstay of long range army logistics are three AN-32s acquired in 1994.

Aircraft Inventory

References

Peruvian Army
Military equipment of Peru
Peru
Equipment